Borgfelde is a quarter of Hamburg, Germany, in the borough of Hamburg-Mitte. It is located on the northern border of the borough adjacent to the borough of Hamburg-Nord. It is a more densely populated area, approximately 2 km from Hamburg city centre. With a size of around 0.9 square kilometers it is one of the smallest quarters of Hamburg.

Name
The name Borgfelde refers to fields of pastureland belonging to the citizens (Bürger, Low German Borger or Börger). The name of the street Bürgerweide, which leads through the quarter, has the same origin.

Geography
Borgfelde borders the quarters of Hohenfelde, Hamm, Hammerbrook, and St. Georg. The southern border is formed by the channel of Mittelkanal. Borgfelde is separated in two parts, called by the inhabitants Oben Borgfelde (Upper Borgfelde) and Unten Borgfelde (Lower Borgfelde), by the former federal road of Bundesstraße 5 as well as by a Geest slope.

History
Borgfelde faced major destruction during the Bombing of Hamburg in World War II. Today it is therefore dominated by brick apartment buildings built or reconstructed in the 1950s and 60s. This applies also to the church of Erlöserkirche (Redeemer's Church). Originally built in 1902 and destroyed by the bombing in 1943, it was re-built with a then modern architecture in 1952.

Politics
These are the results of Borgfelde in the Hamburg state election:

References

External links
 Borgfelde, Hamburg.de

Quarters of Hamburg
Hamburg-Mitte